Constituencies in Penang are electoral divisions within the Malaysian state of Penang, of which there are two types. There are 13 Parliamentary Constituencies within the state, with each Parliamentary Constituency electing a single Member of Parliament into the Federal Parliament of Malaysia. Penang is also divided into 40 State Constituencies, with each State Constituency electing a single State Assemblyman into the Penang State Legislative Assembly.

The electoral divisions within Penang are arranged in such a way that a single Parliamentary Constituency contains between three and four State Constituencies. Parliamentary Constituencies are denoted by Pxxx, whereas State Constituencies are denoted by Nxx.

List of Parliamentary and State Constituencies 

The Parliamentary and State Constituencies won by each political party  are as follows. Note that the map is colour-coded to depict the incumbent party in every State Constituency. Parliamentary Constituencies are in red upper case lettering, whilst State Constituencies are in blue letters. 

The Parliamentary and State Constituencies within the State of Penang  are further listed below, along with the respective Members of Parliament and State Assemblymen.

Seberang Perai

Penang Island

Demographics

Seberang Perai

Penang Island

See also 
 Penang State Legislative Assembly
 Elections in Penang
 List of Malaysian electoral districts

References 

 
 
Politics of Penang